Amy Jayne "Dolly" Everett (1 May 2003 – 3 January 2018) was a 14-year-old Australian teenager who killed herself as a result of suspected mental illness and being a victim of cyberbullying. Her suicide sparked debates about teen suicide, racial and gender imbalance in media reporting of suicide and the dangers of publicity around suicides and emphasising victim playing, glorifying and promoting suicide.

Everett was from Katherine in the Australian Northern Territory and had attended Scots PGC College in Warwick, Queensland.  When she was younger, Everett had been a face in advertisements for Akubra hats.

Tributes and legacy
Everett's suicide prompted tributes and reactions, including many from those who had not known her. Memorial services for Everett were held in Katherine and Warwick at which mourners were encouraged to wear Everett's favourite colour, blue.

Everett's parents launched a social media campaign using the hashtag #DoItForDolly to raise awareness of the effects of bullying and a foundation called the Dolly's Dream Foundation, with support from the Alannah and Madeline Foundation, which raised over $106,000 in three month by GoFundMe. and shared a drawing by Everett, depicting a figure underneath the words "stand up, speak even if your voice shakes", a quote which has since been used to encourage young bullying victims to speak up about their experiences. 

New South Wales passed legislation criminalising certain cyberbullying which was referred to as Dolly's Law.

Reporting issues
The media were criticised for over-simplifying Everett's suicide, with doubts expressed about whether bullying alone caused her death.  Professor Peter Jones from Bond University said that while bullying may have played a role in Everett's death, he believed she had a severe mental illness such as depression, which caused her to reach the decision to kill herself. Jones believes the media were too quick to blame bullying as the unequivocal cause of Everett's death.

The Australian Government media initiative, "Mindframe", also raised a number of concerns about the way the media were covering the death of Everett. It criticised the media for sharing a memorial video released by Everett's family, suggesting that the promotion of such public memorials should be avoided, due to the risk it posed to those experiencing similar life circumstances, or who were having suicidal thoughts. Mindframe also urged the media to stop implying Everett's suicide was preceded by bullying or caused solely by it.

In the wake of Everett's death, there were also calls to ban or police social media apps known to be used for cyberbullying, such as Sarahah. However, some commentators, such as Ginger Gorman, described the calls as knee-jerk reactions that would likely be ineffective and could potentially remove online support for bullying victims.

Other commentators viewed the substantial media interest and public outcry generated by Everett's death as an example of what they perceived to be an indifference to an ongoing youth suicide crisis among Aboriginal Australians, which attracts little media interest.

References 

2018 suicides
Deaths by person in Australia
Suicides in Queensland
Victims of cyberbullying